Niclas Tokerud is a Norwegian politician for the Labour Party. He served as a deputy representative to the Parliament of Norway from Buskerud during the term 2013–2017,
and is currently elected to the same position for the term 2017–2021  He hails from Vestfossen.

References

Living people
People from Øvre Eiker
Deputy members of the Storting
Labour Party (Norway) politicians
Buskerud politicians
Year of birth missing (living people)